"Salty Dog Blues" is a folk song from the early 1900s.  Musicians have recorded it in a number of styles, including blues, jazz, country music, bluegrass.  Papa Charlie Jackson recorded an adaptation for Paramount and Broadway in 1924. According to Jas Obrecht, "Old-time New Orleans musicians from Buddy Bolden’s era recalled hearing far filthier versions of 'Salty Dog Blues' long before Papa Charlie’s recording." Similar versions were recorded by Mississippi John Hurt and Lead Belly.

The Morris Brothers version includes "Let me be your Salty Dog, Or I won't be your man at all, Honey let me be your salty dog." According to Richard Matteson:

Music Services, an administrator for music publishers, identifies the song as "Public Domain", while the performing rights organizations American Society of Composers, Authors and Publishers (ASCAP) and Broadcast Music, Inc. (BMI) list songwriters and composers of over 10 works titled "Salty Dog Blues".

History 
In his Library of Congress interviews, Jelly Roll Morton recalled a three-piece string band led by Bill Johnson playing the number to great acclaim. Interviewed in the documentary Earl Scruggs: His Family and Friends, Zeke Morris, of the Morris Brothers, claimed to have written the song, although the song had been recorded before the Morris Brothers began performing as a group.

Curly Seckler, who played with Flatt and Scruggs and with Charlie Monroe, was interviewed by Frank Stasio on the December 26, 2008 edition of The State of Things.  Seckler was asked about the origin of the name "Salty Dog" and replied that he had been told that it was the name of a locally produced soft drink.

Lyrics
As with many folk songs, the lyrics can vary substantially. Some of the lyrics were published as early as 1911 by Howard Odum in his article "Folk-Song and Folk-Poetry as Found in the Secular Songs of the Southern Negroes" in The Journal of American Folklore.

One of the older versions runs:

References

External links
Public domain lyrics and MP3 of a Creative Commons-licensed performance of the song by Roger McGuinn at Folk Den.

American folk songs
Blues songs
1927 singles
Songs about dogs